All Is Wild, All Is Silent is the third studio album by post-rock band Balmorhea, released by Western Vinyl on March 10, 2009. For this album, Aisha Burns, Travis Chapman, Nicole Kern, and Taylor Tehan were recruited.

Track listing

Personnel
 Aisha Burns – violin
 Travis Chapman – upright bass
 Jesy Fortino – vocals
 Nicole Kern – cello
 Michael Muller – guitar, piano, vocals
 Rob Lowe – banjo, guitar, piano, vocals, melodica
 Taylor Tehan – drums 
and
 Andrew Hernandez – engineer, mixing
 Jeff Lipton – mastering
 Maria Rice – audio engineer

References 

2009 albums
Western Vinyl albums